WKXG may refer to:

 WKXG (FM), a radio station (92.7 FM) licensed to serve Moorhead, Mississippi, United States
 WKXG (AM), a defunct radio staton (1540 AM) formerly licensed to serve Greenwood, Mississippi